Monica Pinette (born February 5, 1977) is a two-time Olympic modern pentathlete from Canada. She is one of the first female Canadian modern pentathletes, and the only indigenous athlete of (Métis) to compete at the 2004 Summer Olympics in Athens, Greece.  Her 13th place finish overall at the 2004 Summer Olympics was Canada's best recorded performance in the modern pentathlon to date.

Early life and career
Pinette was born in the city of Vancouver and grew up in Langley, British Columbia. Pinette began her sporting career as a member of the Pony Club in Vancouver. She took up the pentathlon at age 21. She has participated in modern pentathlon at different local clubs for swimming, shooting, fencing, and horse-riding. Pinette provides a unique challenge for her opponents as she is left handed, a rarity in the sport of fencing.

Pinette graduated from the University of Victoria with a bachelor of arts degree in English, and earned a diploma in Journalism and Photojournalism from the Western Academy of Photography. She was coached by her husband Philipp Waeffler, 1996 Olympic modern pentathlete from Switzerland.

Pinette describes the dynamic of having her husband and coach be the same person as having "Two Philipps" and admits that she has to separate her husband from coach in order to avoid getting frustrated. In 2009, Monica Pinette received the British Columbia Premier's Award. She received a National Aboriginal Achievement Award, now known as the Indspire Awards in the sport category in 2010. Pinette admits she was surprised to win the award, as pentathlon is a small sport, and usually lacks media coverage or attention.

Awards
She made her international debut at the 2002 and 2003 World Championships and eventually competed at the 2003 Pan American Games in Santo Domingo, Dominican Republic, where she finished seventh. Following this Pinette qualified for the 2004 Summer Olympics in Athens, along with her compatriot Kara Grant. They made their national debut in the women's event. With her strongest performance in the fencing segment, Pinette finished successfully in thirteenth place, the highest position achieved by a modern Canadian pentathlete, male or female, in Olympic history.

Pinette continued to earn a fourth-place finish for the team relay at the 2006 World Modern Pentathlon Championships in Guatemala City, Guatemala, and also, her first medal by winning gold at the Pan American Championships in the same year. She also added her silver medal at the 2007 Pan American Games in Rio de Janeiro, Brazil, automatically receiving a qualifying berth for the 2008 Summer Olympics in Beijing. At the Olympics, Pinette finished in twenty-seventh place, following a poor performance in the last three sporting segments.

Personal life 
Currently, Monica Pinette is a retired pentathlete and is working towards raising awareness for aboriginal athletes in Canada as well as giving advice on how to live a healthy lifestyle, specifically as an aboriginal person. She contributed to the creation of a booklet titled Growing Up Healthy that encourages First Nations parents in British Columbia to live a healthy lifestyle. Pinette has a son named Bruno.

References

External links

  (archived page from Pentathlon.org)
 Canadian Olympic Team Profile
 Canoe Canada Profile

1977 births
Living people
Canadian female modern pentathletes
Olympic modern pentathletes of Canada
Modern pentathletes at the 2007 Pan American Games
Modern pentathletes at the 2004 Summer Olympics
Modern pentathletes at the 2008 Summer Olympics
Pan American Games silver medalists for Canada
Sportspeople from Vancouver
Indspire Awards
Métis sportspeople
Pan American Games medalists in modern pentathlon
Medalists at the 2007 Pan American Games
20th-century Canadian women
21st-century Canadian women